Siddheswor may refer to:

Siddheswor, Achham, Nepal
Siddheswor, Baitadi, Nepal
Siddheswor, Kosi, Nepal